Rinorea ulmifolia is a species of plant in the Violaceae family. It is endemic to Colombia.

References

ulmifolia
Endemic flora of Colombia
Vulnerable plants
Taxonomy articles created by Polbot